Chris Field is a Los Angeles-based composer, songwriter, producer and musician. He was raised in the San Fernando Valley, and played guitar in Los Angeles for groups among multiple genres including electric guitar, jazz, and rock music. He learned how to compose music by inputting compositions from Ludwig van Beethoven and Sergei Prokofiev into his computer. Through his music associates, he became acquainted with two friends who started X-Ray Dog, and he began to contribute musical compositions to this company.  Field also works with Extreme Music, and through them, Field's music has been placed in numerous television shows. In December 2014, a part of Field's catalogue was acquired by BMG Chrysalis, with whom he continues to work, on major film and television campaigns.

Field's music has appeared in the films, "Elle", "Tropic Thunder", "Dumb and Dumber To", as well as countless television shows. Field's work as a musical composer for movie theatrical trailers has included  Valerian, X-Men, Harry Potter and the Philosopher's Stone, XXX, Austin Powers in Goldmember, Terminator 3: Rise of the Machines, Hotel Rwanda, Kinsey, Pirates of the Caribbean: The Curse of the Black Pearl, Pirates of the Caribbean: Dead Man's Chest, and The Lord of the Rings: The Fellowship of the Ring. His first contribution to a film trailer was for The Full Monty.

Field is the composer of "Gothic Power", which developed an international cult following. "Gothic Power" was the main theme for the trailer for The Lord of the Rings film series; this piece was later in the trailer for Steven Spielberg's War of the Worlds and in the trailer for a film within a film in a sequence for Ben Stiller's movie Tropic Thunder.  The piece was internationally published by X-Ray Dog.

Field became recognized for having started a new direction in cinematic music. In 2014, Field's composition "Acts of Courage" was released on the album, This Is Epic Music, Volume I, through Imperativa Records, via iTunes and on CD. The album notes state that the piece "Gothic Power", written by Field in 1999, started a new direction in cinematic music that came to be identified as epic music.  Through this album, by Imperativa Records, Field's trailer compositions became available for sale to the public for the first time.  Field's catalogue of film trailer music has since become available for sale to the public on iTunes through X-Ray Dog.

Albums
In 2020, Field released his third album "Beneath the Sun", an orchestral work which includes new music derived from his most popular film trailer themes, available on iTunes and all major platforms. Field released his second album "Personal Elegy", a rock album, in 2015.  This album is classic rock, vintage rock, and retro seventies.  The original music and lyrics are presented in a retrospective of classic rock styles, in high audio fidelity.  This album is not available to the public but is for license only. The track "Movin'", about being tired of being in the same scene, and needing a change, has been licensed for a number of major television shows.

Field co-produced, recorded, mixed and mastered the jazz album "Distance Traveled", in 2014, for David Becker Tribune. This album is available for sale in digital format on iTunes, cdbaby, and Amazon.

Field's trailer composition, "Acts of Courage" was made available to the public, for sale for the first time on the album "This Is Epic Music, Volume I", through Imperativa Records, in 2014.  Prior to that time, Field's trailer compositions were never made available for sale.  Since that time, X-Ray Dog has released its catalogue of Field's music to the public for sale.  In 2017, the pieces "Act of Courage" and "The Vision", respectively, reached the number 1 and number 9 positions for top sales in the X-Ray Dog catalogue on iTunes.

Field released his debut album, "Sub-Conscious" in 2006; it was made available on iTunes, CD Baby, Amazon.com, and for retail sale.  It received a positive reception, and his song "Floating" from the album reached spot number eight in the New Age genre for iTunes in Luxembourg on July 7, 2011.  Sub-Conscious was awarded Best Neo-Classical Album, 2006, by New Age Reporter.

Early life and family
Field was raised in the San Fernando Valley. He played guitar in Los Angeles for a period of time as a young man. He contributed to productions including electric guitar, jazz, and rock music. He acquired his first computer about 1998, wherein he began to learn musical composition and production. He experimented by taking compositions from Ludwig van Beethoven and Sergei Prokofiev, and inputting them electronically into his computer. He noted in a 2006 interview that his wife Katie O'Brien Field helped with promotion of his music.

Career

Film trailers
He met associate Mitch Lijewski through his guitar playing, and was introduced to Tim Stithem. Lijewski and Stithem started X-Ray Dog and he started contributing musical composition through work with this firm. Field has worked as a composer for theatrical trailers for films. His trailer musical composition work has included films such as X-Men, Harry Potter and the Philosopher's Stone, XXX, Austin Powers in Goldmember, Terminator 3: Rise of the Machines, Hotel Rwanda, Kinsey, Pirates of the Caribbean: The Curse of the Black Pearl, Pirates of the Caribbean: Dead Man's Chest, and The Lord of the Rings: The Fellowship of the Ring.

His first musical composition for a movie trailer was for the film The Full Monty; he worked on this piece with friend Mark Griskey who was a fellow composer at X-Ray Dog. Field explained his thought process on the film trailer: "A trailer, is like a one-minute or whatever, mini movie that's got to have its own feeling and form to it — trailer music is very intense and gets right to the point. It sounds simple, but it's taken me some years to really figure out. I call it 'rock and roll orchestra' because it's got orchestral elements and, sometimes, a choir, but it also has a lot of rock elements like the drive, the drums and the way it just builds and builds."

His musical composition piece "Gothic Power" was used in trailers for The Lord of the Rings film series. The debut of the first trailer in theaters was quite popular with fans. Subsequently, the piece was utilized by Ben Stiller in a fictional movie trailer for a film within a film in Tropic Thunder. He composed a piece called "The Vision" which incorporated string music; it was utilized for the end of the trailer for the 2007 film Atonement. Although uncredited on the film, Field's composition, "The Journey" is the music for the end credits of the 2006 DVD release of the movie The Secret.

Solo artist

Field released his debut album, Sub-Conscious, in 2006. It featured orchestral music from the Northwest Sinfonia. He created the album as a way to branch out from theatrical trailer composition into work as a solo artist. Field utilizes Logic Pro and MIDI for his musical composition; after this process he delivers these files along with an MP3 to the individual in charge of orchestration, who uses Finale software to convert this to musical notation. The album was made available on iTunes, CD Baby, Amazon.com, and for retail sale].

The album received a positive review from Jamie Bonk of ZoneMusicReporter.com, who commented: "As far as debut albums are concerned, composer/producer/multi- instrumentalist Chris Field's Sub-Conscious is an outstanding record: great compositions and arrangements, first-rate performances and most importantly a defined point of view.".

Sub-Conscious has since become a top seller and editor's pick in two categories on the cdbaby platform, with citations on the site as top seller editor's pick in both the Ambient and Neo-Classical genres at https://store.cdbaby.com/Picks/240 for Ambient and 
https://store.cdbaby.com/Picks/586 for Neo-Classical.

Discography
Track listing

Filmography
The following is a complete list of music Field has composed.

Film

Video games

See also
 Atonement (soundtrack)
 Neoclassical (New Age)
 Trailer music
 X-Ray Dog

References

Further reading

External links

 Chris Field, videos on Vimeo

Living people
Musicians from Los Angeles
Singer-songwriters from California
Year of birth missing (living people)